Mundo de juguete (English: Toy World) is a Mexican telenovela produced by Televisa. It is a remake of the 1973 Argentine telenovela Papá corazón. It premiered on November 4, 1974, on Canal de las Estrellas and ended on February 25, 1977.

This telenovela holds the record for having the second longest run ever for a Latin American telenovela, with a total of 605 half hour episodes (1974–1977). Most telenovelas run for an average of six to eight months; the shortest ones run about four months, and the longest up to a year. Televisa remade the telenovela in 2000, and called it "Carita de ángel".

Plot
Cristina is Mariano's daughter, a widower. She attends a Catholic school and creates a world of her own ("mundo de juguete") in the school garden. At school she meets "Nana Tomasina", an old woman who lives behind the boarding school where Cristina attends. She takes the lonely girl in and advises her. Cristina succeeds in making her father marry Rosario who was a novice at the convent/boarding school so that she can have a new mother.

Cast
Graciela Mauri as Cristina
Ricardo Blume as Mariano Salinas
Irma Lozano as Rosario
Irán Eory as Mercedes Balboa
Enrique Rocha as Leopoldo Balboa
Sara García as Nana Tomasita
Evita Muñoz "Chachita" as Hermana Carmela
Gloria Marín as Madre Superiora
Xavier Marc as Padre Benito
Maricarmen Martínez as Toña
Manuel Calvo as Fermín
Cristina Rubiales as Lina
Marilyn Pupo

References

External links

1974 telenovelas
1974 Mexican television series debuts
1977 Mexican television series endings
Mexican telenovelas
Televisa telenovelas
Children's telenovelas
Mexican television series based on Argentine television series
Spanish-language telenovelas
Television series about children